The Nissequogue River is an  long river flowing from Smithtown, New York into the Long Island Sound. The river, like all other freshwater rivers on the island, is totally derived from groundwater (not from lakes). Its name is derived from one of the Algonquian-speaking Nissequaq tribe in the area.

The river rises south of NY-454 just east of the Hauppauge County Offices and flows into Blydenburgh Park Pond where other tributaries that come from East Hauppauge and Commack meet and are dammed at Blydenburgh Pond. The river continues in a northeasterly direction, picking up additional tributaries from the north in Caleb Smith Park in Smithtown (where special regulation trout fishing is available). It is dammed once more before becoming an estuary at NY-25 where it then flows to Kings Park, New York, entering Long Island Sound at Nissequogue River State Park.  Since much of the river is an estuary canoeists travel in both directions based on the tides.

Fish found in the river include Striped Bass, Bluefish, Summer Flounder, Winter Flounder, Porgies, Eels, Brown, Rainbow and Brook Trout, Yellow Perch, Largemouth Bass, Alewives, Herring, Shad, etc.

List of crossings of the Nissequogue River

Northeast Branch

References

External links
FWS profile of river
Sunysb profile of river

Rivers of Suffolk County, New York
Smithtown, New York
Rivers of New York (state)